New Market Historic District is a national historic district located at New Market, Shenandoah County, Virginia. The district encompasses 11 contributing buildings in the crossroads town of New Market.  It includes a variety of commercial, residential, and institutional buildings dating primarily from 19th century. They are in a variety of popular architectural styles including Victorian, Federal, and Georgian.  Notable buildings include the Henkel house (c. 1800), Lee-Jackson Hotel (c. 1810), Solon Henkel House (c. 1800), Salyard House, Rupp House, and Emmanuel Lutheran Church.

It was listed on the National Register of Historic Places in 1972.

References

Historic districts in Shenandoah County, Virginia
Federal architecture in Virginia
Victorian architecture in Virginia
Georgian architecture in Virginia
National Register of Historic Places in Shenandoah County, Virginia
Historic districts on the National Register of Historic Places in Virginia